Brown Township is one of the twelve townships of Miami County, Ohio, United States.  The 2000 census found 1,554 people in the township, 1,044 of whom lived in the unincorporated portions of the township.

Geography
Located in the northeastern edge of the county, it borders the following townships:
Green Township, Shelby County - north
Johnson Township, Champaign County - northeast
Jackson Township, Champaign County - southeast
Lostcreek Township - south
Staunton Township - southwest corner
Springcreek Township - west
Orange Township, Shelby County - northwest

The village of Fletcher is located in the southwest quadrant of Brown Township, and the unincorporated community of Conover lies in the township's east.

Name and history
Brown Township was organized in 1819. It is one of eight Brown Townships statewide.

Government
The township is governed by a three-member board of trustees, who are elected in November of odd-numbered years to a four-year term beginning on the following January 1. Two are elected in the year after the presidential election and one is elected in the year before it. There is also an elected township fiscal officer, who serves a four-year term beginning on April 1 of the year after the election, which is held in November of the year before the presidential election. Vacancies in the fiscal officership or on the board of trustees are filled by the remaining trustees.

References

External links
County website

Townships in Miami County, Ohio
Townships in Ohio